Escharinidae is a family of bryozoans belonging to the order Cheilostomatida.

Genera
Genera:
 Allotherenia Winston & Vieira, 2013
 Bactridium Reuss, 1848
 Bryopesanser Tilbrook, 2006
 Chiastosella Canu & Bassler, 1934
 Dightonia Brown, 1948
 Escharina Milne Edwards, 1836
 Herentia Gray, 1848
 Phaeostachys Hayward, 1979
 Schizobathysella Canu & Bassler, 1917
 Taylorus Pérez, López Gappa, Vieira & Gordon, 2020
 Therenia David & Pouyet, 1978
 Toretocheilum Rogick, 1960

References

Bryozoan families